Jeff Tallon is a Canadian contemporary artist who presently lives and works in Toronto, Ontario, Canada. He is noted for synthesizing mobile technology with traditional oil painting and publicly displayed Canada’s first QR Code painting at the 2010 Toronto International Art Fair.

Biography

Tallon was born in St. Catharines, Ontario. He attended high school at E.L. Crossley and in his final year he co-opted under the tutelage of Ken Cosgrove, a.k.a. Groundskeeper Willy, at Niagara College in the Creative Arts and Design program.

At 18, Tallon moved to Calgary, Alberta to attend the Alberta College of Art & Design (ACAD). While at ACAD he played an active role in the community and volunteered at the Stride and Truck galleries. Tallon majored in Drawing and jockeyed between animation and oil painting. He studied under, among others, Richard Halliday, Bev Tosh, Mary Scott, Don Mabie and Chris Cran.

Upon graduating from ACAD in 2003, he moved to Gunsan, South Korea where he lived and worked for six months.

In 2004, Tallon moved to Dublin, Ireland where he studied at the Dublin Business School. Throughout this period he lived in Dublin’s affluent Ballsbridge neighbourhood and continued to paint.

In 2005, Tallon traveled through Northern Europe to Saint Petersburg and Moscow, Russia. He then journeyed south to Israel and Egypt and moved onto Western Europe before returning to Canada.

When Tallon returned to Canada he moved to Welland, Ontario and presented designs to the Welland City Council for an 8 ft. x 10 ft. painting commemorating the development of the new Civic Square. A motion was passed to explore the project, however, the work never came to fruition.

Later, in 2007, Tallon attended and graduated from Sheridan College where he studied Interactive Multimedia.

In 2008, he began sharing a studio space with approximately 40 other artists at Walnut Studios in Toronto, Ontario, Canada.

Early work

At ACAD, Tallon explored classical animation and fused together drawings, paintings and photographs with ethereal sounds by musicians like Sigur Ros. He would alternate, year-by-year, between rich, textural paintings and animations that synthesized image and sound, which referenced work by the Canadian animator Norman McLaren.

Recent work

Since moving to Toronto, Tallon has been creating pieces that fuse together mobile technology, photography and oil painting. The works are Toronto-centric, yet global in nature. Subject matter includes the 2009 Tamil diaspora protests in Canada, the 2009 City of Toronto inside and outside workers strike, Queen Elizabeth II’s 2010 visit to Canada and the 2010 G-20 Toronto summit. These works explore notions of nationalism, identity, truth, commerce, commercialism and communication.

Tallon participates in Walnut Studio group exhibitions at Walnut Studios and throughout Toronto. Recently, he has shown works at the Toronto International Art Fair and The Artist Project.

References

External links
 

Living people
Canadian contemporary painters
21st-century Canadian painters
Canadian male painters
Canadian multimedia artists
Artists from St. Catharines
Sheridan College alumni
Year of birth missing (living people)
21st-century Canadian male artists